Jackson Allen (born 14 April 1993) is a former professional Australian rules football player at the Gold Coast Football Club in the Australian Football League (AFL).

He was recruited by the club in the 2011 National Draft, with pick #91, as a Queensland zone selection. Allen made his debut in Round 20, 2012, against  at Carrara Stadium. He played four games over two seasons before being delisted at the end of the 2014 season.

In 2019 Allen was named co-captain of the Aspley Hornets in the NEAFL

Statistics

|- style="background-color: #EAEAEA"
! scope="row" style="text-align:center" | 2012
|
| 31 || 1 || 0 || 0 || 11 || 4 || 15 || 5 || 4 || 0.0 || 0.0 || 11.0 || 4.0 || 15.0 || 5.0 || 4.0
|-
! scope="row" style="text-align:center" | 2013
|
| 31 || 3 || 0 || 0 || 21 || 3 || 24 || 12 || 5 || 0.0 || 0.0 || 7.0 || 1.0 || 8.0 || 4.0 || 1.7
|- class="sortbottom"
! colspan=3| Career
! 4
! 0
! 0
! 32
! 7
! 39
! 17
! 9
! 0.0
! 0.0
! 8.0
! 1.8
! 9.8
! 4.3
! 2.3
|}

References

External links

1993 births
Living people
Gold Coast Football Club players
Australian rules footballers from Queensland
Morningside Australian Football Club players
Aspley Football Club players